Hayk Ishkhanyan (born 24 June 1989 in Yerevan) is an Armenian football player who currently plays as a defender for Ararat Yerevan and the Armenia national football team.

Career
On 21 June 2019, Ishkhanyan signed for FC Alashkert.

On 23 January 2020, Ishkhanyan was released by Alashkert to pursue a move abroad, however after initially signing for Kazakhstan Premier League club Zhetysu following his release, Ishkhanyan returned to Alashkert on 4 March 2020.

On 21 July 2020, FC Gandzasar Kapan announced the return of Ishkhanyan.

On 19 June 2021, Ishkhanyan signed for FC Pyunik. Less three months later, 13 September 2021, Ishkhanyan left Pyunik to sign for BKMA Yerevan.

On 27 June 2022, Ararat Yerevan announced the signing of Ishkhanyan.

Career statistics

International

International goals

Scores and results list Armenia's goal tally first, score column indicates score after each Armenia goal.

References

External links

1989 births
Living people
Footballers from Yerevan
Armenian footballers
Armenia international footballers
Association football midfielders
FC Shirak players
FC Mika players
FC Alashkert players
FC Gandzasar Kapan players
FC Lori players
Armenian Premier League players